Gongzhu Temple or Princess Temple is a Buddhist temple located in Xingyuan Township of Fanshi County, Shanxi, China.

History
The original temple dates back to the 4th century, in the Northern Wei (386–534). Legend said that the temple was built by Princess Chengxin, the fourth daughter of Emperor Wencheng.

According to the Records of Qingliang Mountain, the temple belonged to the jurisdiction of Mount Wutai.

On 18 August 1986, the temple was designated as a provincial key cultural preservation unit by the Shanxi Provincial Government.

On 25 May 2006, it was listed among the sixth batch of "Major National Historical and Cultural Sites in Shanxi" by the State Council of China.

Architecture
The entire complex faces the south. Along the central axis are the Shanmen, Second Hall, Mahavira Hall, and Back Hall.

Mahavira Hall
The Mahavira Hall still preserves the architectural style of the Ming dynasty. There are thirty Ming dynasty (1368–1644) statues in the hall. In the middle is Sakyamuni, statues of Amitabha and Bhaisajyaguru stand on the left and right sides of Sakyamuni's statue. In front of Sakyamuni stand Ananda and Kassapa Buddha on the left and right. The statues of Eighteen Arhats sitting on the seats before both sides of the gable walls.

Gallery

References

Buddhist temples in Xinzhou
Buildings and structures in Xinzhou
Tourist attractions in Xinzhou
Major National Historical and Cultural Sites in Shanxi